Anita Felguth, also known as Anita Felguth-Denker, (13 May 1909 in Hamburg-Altona – 21 June 2003 in Berlin) was a German table tennis player.

Table tennis career
From 1932 to 1936 she won six medals in singles, doubles and team events in the World Table Tennis Championships.

The six World Championship medals included one gold medal in the 1934 World Table Tennis Championships team event for Germany.

See also
 List of table tennis players
 List of World Table Tennis Championships medalists

References

German female table tennis players
Sportspeople from Hamburg
1909 births
2003 deaths